The 1st Brigade Georgia Militia was raised for service with the Continental Army as part of the Georgia Militia. The regiment was disbanded.

References

Military units and formations established in 1775
Georgia (U.S. state) militia